Sin identidad (English: No identity) is a Spanish thriller drama television series produced by Diagonal TV for Antena 3. The series was premiered on May 13, 2014.

Cast 
Main
 Megan Montaner as María Fuentes Vergel/María Duque/Mercedes Dantés (Episode 1-¿?)
 Tito Valverde as Enrique Vergel (Episode 1-¿?)
 Jordi Rebellón as Francisco José Fuentes Celaya (Episode 1-¿?)
 Daniel Grao as Juan Prados (Episode 1-¿?)
 Lydia Bosch as Luisa Vergel de Fuentes (Episode 1-¿?)
 Miguel Ángel Muñoz as Bruno Vergel (Episode 1-¿?) 
  as Roberto Baffi (Episodes 2-6) 
 Eloy Azorín as Pablo (Episode 1-¿?)
 Verónica Sánchez as Amparo Duque (Episode 2-¿?)
  as Curro (Episode 2-¿?) 
 Mar Regueras as Miriam Prats (Episode 10-¿?)
 Silvia Alonso as Helena Prats (Episode 10-¿?)
 Raúl Prieto as Alex Barral (Episode 10-¿?)
 Mateo Jalón as Enrique "Quique" Fuentes (Episode 10-¿?)
  as Eva (Episode 10-¿?)
  as Blanca (Episode 10-¿?)
  as Irina Petrova (Episode 1-5)
  as Eugenia de Vergel (Episode 1-9)
 Victoria Abril as Fernanda Duque (Episode 2-7)

Other

Episodes

Season 1

Season 2

Accolades 

|-
| align = "center" | 2014 || 2nd  || colspan = "2" | Best Drama Series ||  || 
|-
| align = "center" rowspan = "8" | 2015 || 17th  || colspan = "2" | Best Spanish Fiction ||  || 
|-
| rowspan = "5" | 24th Actors and Actresses Union Awards || Best Leading Actress (TV) || Megan Montaner ||  || rowspan = "5" | 
|-
| Best Leading Actor (TV) || Eloy Azorín || 
|-
| rowspan = "2" | Best Supporting Actress (TV) || Verónica Sánchez || 
|-
| Victoria Abril || 
|-
| Best Actress in a Minor Performance (TV) || Elvira Mínguez || 
|-
| 17th Iris Awards || Best Actress || Victoria Abril ||  || 
|-
| 3rd  || Best Drama Actress || Megan Montaner ||  || 
|-
| align = "center" rowspan = "2" | 2016 || 25th Actors and Actresses Union Awards || Best Supporting Actor (TV) || Eloy Azorín ||  || 
|-
| 18th Iris Awards || Best Actress || Verónica Sánchez ||  || 
|}

References

External links 
  
 

2010s Spanish drama television series
2014 Spanish television series debuts
Antena 3 (Spanish TV channel) network series
Television shows set in Spain
2015 Spanish television series endings
Spanish thriller television series
Television series about revenge
Television series by Diagonal TV